Sandro Grande (born September 29, 1977) is a Canadian former soccer player.

Club career

Italy
Born  in Montreal, Quebec, Grande began his career in Italy, He played four years with U.S.Frenter Larino  and Potenza and Frosinone in the late 1990s and early 2000s.

Grande became the first Quebec-born footballer to sign with a Serie A club, signing a three-year deal with Brescia in 2001. After appearing in just one match for the first team, in the Intertoto Cup in July 2001, Grande was loaned back to Serie C side Frosinone, and then later played in Serie D with  U.S.Frenter Larino and Potenza and Albalonga.

Canada/Scandinavia
Grande returned to Canada in 2004 to play for the Montreal Impact of the USL First Division, where he played 30 games and was selected to the First All-Star Team for 2004.

In July 2005, he moved to Norway to play for Viking in the Norwegian Premier League, before moving on to Molde in March 2006. After his contract with Molde expired in 2007, the club chose not to renew it. After fully recovering from surgery on both knees, he returned to Montreal Impact. Upon his return Grande scored one goal in six regular season games, which he scored on September 5 against the Minnesota Thunder. He helped the Impact qualify for the CONCACAF Champions League quarter finals, playing six games in the tournament.

On December 2, 2008 the Montreal Impact announced the re-signing of Grande. He was released July 20, 2009 following an in-game choking incident with team captain Mauro Biello.

Lithuania
On March 16, 2010 Sandro Grande signed a contract with Lithuanian club FK Suduva.

Return to Canada

In 2012, Sandro Grande signed a contract with the FC St-Léonard of the Première Ligue de Soccer du Québec. He was capped for 13 games, scoring 3 goals.

Currently, Sandro Grande is the Technical Director of Les Étoiles de L'Est.

International career
Grande made his debut for the Canada national team in a September 2004 World Cup qualification match against Costa Rica and has earned a total of 12 caps, scoring 1 goal. He has represented Canada in 4 FIFA World Cup qualification matches and was a member of Canada's squad at the 2005 CONCACAF Gold Cup.

International goals
Scores and results list Canada's goal tally first.

Coaching career

CS Monteuil
On September 20, 2018 CS Monteuil announced Grande as the new team coach for the 2019 PLSQ season,
although he departed before the end of the season.

CF Montréal Reserve

Grande was hired on 9 January 2023 as the head coach of CF Montréal Reserve, the reserve side of MLS club CF Montréal. He was released from the position a day after due to backlash over comments Grande made on Twitter in 2012, following the attempted assassination of Quebec premier Pauline Marois.

References

External links
MontrealImpact.com with Grande's profile
Sandro Grande – Facebook

1977 births
Living people
2005 CONCACAF Gold Cup players
Association football midfielders
Canada men's international soccer players
Canadian expatriate soccer players
Canadian expatriate sportspeople in Italy 
Canadian expatriate sportspeople in Norway
Canadian people of Italian descent
Canadian soccer coaches
Canadian soccer players
Frosinone Calcio players
Expatriate footballers in Italy
Expatriate footballers in Lithuania
Expatriate footballers in Norway
Molde FK players
Montreal Impact (1992–2011) players
Soccer players from Montreal
Eliteserien players
U.S. Catanzaro 1929 players
USL First Division players
Première ligue de soccer du Québec players
Viking FK players
FC St-Léonard players